John Rutter is a former American football coach.  He was the head football coach at Southwest Minnesota State University in Marshall, Minnesota, serving for three seasons, from 1968 to 1970, and compiling a record of 7–19.

References

Year of birth missing (living people)
Living people
Southwest Minnesota State Mustangs football coaches